The Liberal Party of Quebec ran a full slate of 125 candidates in the 2008 provincial election, and elected 66 members to form a majority government.

Candidates (incomplete)

Source: Résultats, Élections générales (2012, 4 septembre), Le Directeur général des élections du Québec, accessed 11 July 2013.

References

2008